Albertoni is a surname. Notable people with this surname include:

 Gaspare Paluzzi degli Albertoni (1566–1614), Roman Catholic Bishop of Sant'Angelo dei Lombardi e Bisaccia 
 Gianne Albertoni (born 1981), Brazilian actress and model
 Ludovica Albertoni, Blessed (1473–1533), Roman Catholic professed member of the Third Order of Saint Francis
 Marco Albertoni (born 1995), Italian football player
 Paluzzo Paluzzi Altieri degli Albertoni (1623–1698), Italian Catholic Cardinal and Cardinal-Nephew to Pope Clement X
 Paolo Albertoni, Italian painter of the late-Baroque period
 Pietro Albertoni (1849–1933), Italian physiologist and politician

See also 
 Alberti (disambiguation)
 Palazzo Albertoni Spinola, in the 10th District (Rione Campitelli), Rome, Italy